Regional Transportation Authority may refer to:

 Regional Transportation Authority (Illinois), serving Chicago, United States
 Regional Transportation Authority (Tennessee), serving Nashville, United States
 South Florida Regional Transportation Authority, United States

See also
 Regional Transit Authority (disambiguation)